Sander Gillé and Joran Vliegen were the defending champions but chose not to defend their title.

Jonáš Forejtek and Michael Vrbenský won the title after defeating Nikola Čačić and Antonio Šančić 6–4, 6–3 in the final.

Seeds

Draw

References

External links
 Main draw

Svijany Open - Doubles
2019 Doubles